Sondu is a small town border town in Kenya's Kisumu County and Kericho County.The boundary  between Kisumu and Kericho counties has been contentious for years with original boundary posed to have been behind Sondu Police station which was in Kisumu County until 1992 when it was taken back to Kericho County. It borders Homabay County to the south with river Sondu-Miriu acting as a boundary to the south. It also acts as a transport hub between Kericho, Kisumu and Kisii towns as the Kisumu-Kisii highway passing through it.

Sondu is a pocket of political intolerance and prone to post-election violence in periods of five years when elections are held; with the worst one happening in 1992.

Cattle rustling between the Luos and Kipsigis is almost accepted as a norm with the Government curtailing the same by building Antistock theft Police Station at the boarder.

References 

Populated places in Nyanza Province